Northern Air Charter is a small airline based in Peace River, Alberta, Canada. Prior to the COVID-19 pandemic it provided scheduled services to Edmonton International Airport and Calgary International Airport. The airline provides charter services throughout North America

Destinations
As of February 2023, Northern Air serves the following destinations in Alberta:
Calgary (Calgary International Airport)
Bonnyville (Bonnyville Airport)

Fleet

Current
As of 26 February 2023, Northern Air Charter has the following aircraft registered with Transport Canada.

Historical
Aircraft previously operated by Northern Air Charter not included above:
 Beechcraft Queen Air (Model 65)
 Beechcraft King Air (Model 100)
 Beechcraft 1900
 Britten-Norman BN-2 Islander
 Cessna 150
 Cessna 172
 Cessna 185 Skywagon
 Cessna 208
 Cessna 210 Centurion
 de Havilland Canada DHC-6 Twin Otter
 Piper PA-23
 Piper PA-28 Cherokee
 Piper PA-31 Navajo

References

External links
Northern Air

Regional airlines of Alberta